Arthur Edward Bruce O'Neill (19 September 1876 – 6 November 1914), was an Irish Ulster Unionist Party politician who was the first Member of Parliament to be killed in World War I.

Early life
O'Neill was the second but eldest surviving son of Edward O'Neill, 2nd Baron O'Neill, and his wife Lady Louisa Katherine Emma (née Cochrane). Hugh O'Neill, later Baron Rathcavan, was his younger brother.

Career

Military career
O'Neill joined the British Army as a second lieutenant in the 2nd Regiment of Life Guards on 26 May 1897, and was promoted to lieutenant on 15 June 1898. He saw active service in South Africa between 1899 and 1900, during the Second Boer War, for which he was awarded the Queen's South Africa Medal with three clasps. On 3 January 1902 he was promoted to captain, and temporary appointed adjutant to the 2nd Life Guards.

O'Neill fought in the First World War as a captain in "A" Squadron 2nd Life Guards. He was killed in action at Klein Zillebeke ridge on 6 November 1914, aged 38, the first MP to be killed in the conflict. He is commemorated on the Menin Gate in Ypres. O'Neill is also commemorated on Panel 8 of the Parliamentary War Memorial in Westminster Hall, one of 22 MPs that died during World War I to be named on that memorial. O'Neill is one of 19 MPs who fell in the war who are commemorated by heraldic shields in the Commons Chamber. A further act of commemoration came with the unveiling in 1932 of a manuscript-style illuminated book of remembrance for the House of Commons, which includes a short biographical account of the life and death of O'Neill.

Political career
He was elected to the House of Commons for Mid-Antrim in January 1910, succeeding his uncle Robert Torrens O'Neill. His brother Hugh succeeded him as MP for Mid-Antrim.

Personal life
O'Neill married, at St Paul's Church, Knightsbridge, on 21 January 1902, Lady Annabel Crewe-Milnes, daughter of Robert Crewe-Milnes, 1st Marquess of Crewe. The Archbishop of Armagh, Primate of All Ireland, performed the ceremony. Lady Annabel O'Neill later remarried and died in 1948.

O'Neill and his wife had five children; three boys and two girls. Their youngest child, Terence, was less than two months old at the time of his father's death. Their eldest son Shane succeeded his grandfather in the barony in 1928, while their third son Terence O'Neill was Prime Minister of Northern Ireland between 1963 and 1969.

Children:
Hon. Sibyl O'Neill (1902 to 1946), married Lt Col Edward North Buxton, MC in 1924
Hon. Mary Louisa Hermione O'Neill (born 1905), married Lt Col Derek Ernest Frederick Orby Gascoigne in 1934; parents of Bamber Gascoigne
Shane O'Neill, 3rd Baron O'Neill (1907 to 1944 )
Hon. Brian Arthur O'Neill (1911 to 1940 )
Terence O'Neill, Baron O'Neill of the Maine (1914 to 1990), Prime Minister of Northern Ireland

Notes

References
Kidd, Charles, Williamson, David (editors). Debrett's Peerage and Baronetage (1990 edition). New York: St Martin's Press, 1990,

External links
 

1876 births
1914 deaths
Members of the Parliament of the United Kingdom for County Antrim constituencies (1801–1922)
UK MPs 1910
UK MPs 1910–1918
British Life Guards officers
British military personnel killed in World War I
British Army personnel of World War I
Irish Unionist Party MPs
Arthur
Irish people of World War I
Younger sons of barons